There are at least 53 named mountains in Sweet Grass County, Montana.
 Antelope Butte, el. 
 Battleship Butte, el. 
 Big Timber Peak, el. 
 Black Butte, el. 
 Black Butte, el. 
 Boone Mountain, el. 
 Breakneck Mountain, el. 
 Breakneck Plateau, el. 
 Castle Butte, el. 
 Chalice Peak, el. 
 Choo-heh-meen Hills, el. 
 Chrome Mountain, el. 
 Columbine Peak, el. 
 Contact Mountain, el. 
 Crazy Peak, el. 
 Derby Mountain, el. 
 Elk Mountain, el. 
 Ellis Mountain, el. 
 Enos Mountain, el. 
 Evergreen Mountain, el. 
 Fairview Peak, el. 
 Gold Hill, el. 
 Hawley Mountain, el. 
 Haystack Peak, el. 
 Hicks Mountain, el. 
 Hicks Peak, el. 
 Independence Peak, el. 
 Iron Mountain, el. 
 Iron Mountain, el. 
 Jordan Mountain, el. 
 Kid Royal Mountain, el. 
 Knob Hill, el. 
 Lake Mountain, el. 
 Lone Indian Butte, el. 
 Meyer Mountain, el. 
 Monument Peak, el. 
 Morning Star Peak, el. 
 Mount Douglas, el. 
 Packsaddle Butte, el. 
 Piano Hill, el. 
 Picket Pin Mountain, el. 
 Pinnacle Mountain, el. 
 Porcupine Butte, el. 
 Raspberry Butte, el. 
 Red Mountain, el. 
 Sliderock Mountain, el. 
 Snowy Peak, el. 
 Stephens Hill, el. 
 Sugarloaf Mountain, el. 
 Tepee Mountain, el. 
 Timberline Mountain, el. 
 Washburn Mountain, el. 
 Wheeler Butte, el.

See also
 List of mountains in Montana
 List of mountain ranges in Montana

Notes

Sweet Grass